NBHD may refer to:

 Namco Bandai Holdings, a Japanese holding company
 an abbreviation for neighborhood
common rendering of The Neighbourhood, an American alternative rock band formed in 2011.